The Roman Republic was a sister republic of the First French Republic. It was proclaimed on 15 February 1798 after Louis-Alexandre Berthier, a general of the French Revolutionary Army under the rule of Napoleon Bonaparte, had occupied the city of Rome on 10 February. It was led by a Directory of five men and comprised territory conquered from the Papal States. Pope Pius VI was exiled to France and died there in August 1799. The Roman Republic immediately took control of the other two former-papal revolutionary administrations, the Tiberina Republic and the Anconine Republic. The Roman Republic proved short-lived, as Neapolitan troops restored the Papal States in October 1799.

Annexation of Rome
The Napoleonic invasion of Italy from 1796 to 1797 was one of the reasons for his elevation to supreme commander of the French Revolutionary Army during the French Revolutionary Wars. After the creation of the First Coalition (Duchy of Parma and Piacenza, Dutch Republic, Holy Roman Empire, Kingdom of Great Britain, Kingdom of Prussia, Kingdom of Portugal, Kingdom of Sardinia, Kingdom of Spain, etc.) in 1792, Napoleon Bonaparte intended to take the fight to the coalition in Northern Italy to force the Austrians to the negotiating table via an invasion of Piedmont. At the same time, he intended to reinforce the French Revolutionary Army based in Italy, which was outnumbered by Austria and the Italian States. This invasion of the Italian Peninsula was also a diversion since, according to the First Coalition, the main offensive was expected in the Rhine River. Rome, under the rule of the Papal States, was part of the First Coalition, along with several other Italian states.

After crossing the Alps in April 1796 and defeating the Piedmontese army on 12 April 1796 in the Battle of Montenotte and on 21 April 1796 in the Battle of Mondovì, Bonaparte turned his attention south of Piedmont to deal with the Papal States. Bonaparte, skeptical over divided command for the invasion, sent two letters to the Directory. The letters let the Directory relent the invasion for a while. The Austrians were defeated at the Battle of Lodi on 10 May 1796 and retreated to Minico. Under the Treaty of Tolentino, signed on 19 February 1797, Rome was forced to accept an ambassador of the French First Republic. In February 1798, the French invaded the Papal States, motivated by the killing of French general Mathurin-Léonard Duphot in December 1797. After the successful invasion, the Papal States became a French satellite republic renamed as the "Roman Republic", under the leadership of Louis-Alexandre Berthier, one of Bonaparte's generals. Pope Pius VI was taken prisoner, escorted out of Rome on 20 February 1798 and exiled to France, where he later died.

However, plagued by internal struggles, the Roman Republic did not last long and popular support for it was low. On 29 November 1798, the very day that the 1798–1802 War of the Second Coalition had begun, a 1713–1799 army of the Kingdom of Naples literally walked into the lightly guarded city of Rome before simply leaving and returning southward to home. In 1798–1799, the then Governor of the Roman Republic as of 19 November 1798, Jacques MacDonald, led his forces in the Battle of Ferentino (1798), followed by the Battle of Otricoli (1798), and finally the Battle of Civita Castellana (5 December 1798). This was then followed by a military affair at Calvi Risorta and a second military affair on 3 January 1799 at Capua before he resigned his command.

Following an invasion from the army of the Kingdom of Naples on 30 September 1799, the Papal States were restored under the rule of Pope Pius VII in June 1800. The French Revolutionary Army invaded the Papal States again in 1808, after which it was divided between the First French Empire and the Napoleonic Kingdom of Italy until the end of the Napoleonic Wars in 1815.

Government
The Roman Republic's constitutional organization of powers was heavily influenced by that of the French Constitution of 1795, which itself was inspired by and loosely based on that of the ancient Roman Republic. Executive authority was vested in a Consulate consisting of five consuls. The legislative branch was composed of two chambers, a 60-member Tribunate and a 30-member Senate, which elected the consuls.

Flag
The flag of the Roman Republic was a vertical tricolour black-white-red, taken from the French tricolour, as granted by Napoleon Bonaparte.

In popular culture
In the opera Tosca (1900), written by the Italian composer Giacomo Puccini, the character Angelotti is called "consul of the deceased Roman Republic" (the plot takes place in 1800; Angelotti escapes the papal prison); he is a fictional character, although his name evokes that of the Roman consul Liborio Angelucci.

In the short-story titled "The Sisters", written by the Irish novelist James Joyce in the short-story collection Dubliners (1914), the unnamed protagonist remembers being told "stories about the catacombs and about Napoleon Bonaparte..." by Father Flynn, who had studied in Rome.

See also
Consulate of the Roman Republic (1798–1800)
List of historic states of Italy
Napoleonic looting of art
Unification of Italy (1848–1871)

References 

www.historyofwar.org/articles/campaign_napoleon_italy_1796.html
Imperial City: Rome under Napoleon, Susan Vandiver Nicassio, (October 15, 2009, University of Chicago Press), {pp. 20 to 21}

1798 establishments in France
1798 establishments in the Papal States
1799 disestablishments in France
1799 disestablishments in the Papal States
18th century in Rome
Client states of the Napoleonic Wars
Early Modern Italy
Former republics
History of Catholicism in Italy
History of the papacy
Italian states
 

States and territories disestablished in 1799
States and territories established in 1798